Kristine Jarinovska (born 22 August 1977) is legal scientist, doctor of juridical science, legal scholar, sworn advocate, attorney at law and was the Secretary of State of Ministry of Education and Science of the Republic of Latvia.

Education
Jarinovska was raised in the United States state of Wisconsin. She graduated from the Catholic Xavier High School in Appleton, Wisconsin in 1997. Jarinovska graduated from Riga Graduate School of Law in 2003. In her doctoral studies, Jarinovska conducted research at the Université Paris X, Académie de Versailles. Doctor of juridical science, Dr. iur. doctor iuris of the University of Latvia.

Civil servant

Jarinovska works as legal expert for the government. She served as a civil servant from 1999 in the Latvian Ministry of Justice, mainly as Director of the Department of Methodology and Systematization. She participated in a legal research network of European Union independent experts, investigating fundamental rights, legal aid, European law and other law research topics. Jarinovska served as Deputy Director-General State Environmental Service, State Capital Shareholder in various capital companies of the Republic of Latvia, Chairperson of Certification Commission for Insolvency Administrators, Chairperson of Board of Directors state joint-stock company "Courts agency", High Executive state limited liability Gazette of the Republic of Latvia. Jarinovska was leading actor in preparing contract between Latvian and Swedish governments in creating Riga Graduated School of Law and transfer shares to University of Latvia.

Jarinovska was appointed as the State Secretary for Ministry of Education and
Science in 2006. Kristine Jarinovska was elected by Government of Republic of Latvia as Deputy President of former USSR KGB Crimes Research Commission in 2014 as the Chair of Institute of Constitutional Law.

Researcher

In her academic career, Jarinovska has been a fellow Riga Graduate School of Law,  and Law College, and a leading researcher at the European Law Institute and at the University of Latvia. Jarinovska's research interests are the Constitution of the Republic of Latvia.

References

1977 births
Living people
People from Outagamie County, Wisconsin
Latvian legal scholars
Latvian civil servants
Scholars of constitutional law
Latvian women scientists
Xavier High School (Appleton, Wisconsin) alumni